Servant of the servants of God is one of the titles of the pope and is used at the beginning of papal bulls.

History
Pope Gregory I (pope from 590 to 604) was the first pope to use this title extensively to refer to himself, as a lesson in humility for the Archbishop of Constantinople John the Faster, who had been granted the title "Ecumenical Patriarch" by the Byzantine Emperor. Gregory is reported as having negatively reacted to the Patriarch's new title, claiming that "whoever calls himself universal bishop [the imprecise Latin translation of "Ecumenical Patriarch"], or desires this title, is, by his pride, the precursor to the Antichrist."

References

Bibliography 
 
 </ref>

Papal titles